Echium boissieri is a species of flowering plant in the borage family Boraginaceae. It is native to the western Mediterranean Basin in the Iberian Peninsula and Northwest Africa.

References

boissieri